Lick Prairie Precinct is one of the eight precincts of Wabash County, Illinois. The nearest community is Bellmont, Illinois but no town exists in the precinct. The 2008 Illinois earthquake was epicentered towards the middle of the precinct.

Precincts in Wabash County, Illinois